Hadroplontus litura, the canada thistle stem weevil, is a species of minute seed weevil in the family of beetles known as Curculionidae.

References

Further reading

External links

 
 

Ceutorhynchini
Beetles described in 1775
Taxa named by Johan Christian Fabricius